Hyalorbilia is a genus comprising 10 species of  fungi in the family Orbiliaceae. The genus was circumscribed in 2000.

Species
Hyalorbilia arcuata Baral, M.L.Wu & Y.C.Su 2007
Hyalorbilia berberidis (Velen.) Baral 2000
Hyalorbilia biguttulata Baral, M.L.Wu & Y.C.Su 2007
Hyalorbilia brevistipitata B.Liu, Xing Z.Liu & W.Y.Zhuang 2005
Hyalorbilia erythrostigma (W.Phillips) Baral & G.Marson 2000
Hyalorbilia fusispora (Velen.) Baral & G.Marson 2000
Hyalorbilia inflatula (P.Karst.) Baral & G. Marson 2000
Hyalorbilia juliae (Velen.) Baral, Priou & G.Marson 2005
Hyalorbilia lunata (Korf) Baral 2000

References

External links

Helotiales